Thavam is a 2007 Tamil-language romantic drama film directed by Sakthi Paramesh, written by Puri Jagannadh, and produced by Arjun Sarja, who also has a cameo appearance in the film. A remake of the Telugu film Itlu Sravani Subramanyam, it stars Arun Vijay and Vandana Gupta while Vadivelu, Janagaraj, and Kalairani play supporting roles. The music was composed by D. Imman. The film released on 5 October 2007. The dialogue Aahan spoken by Vadivelu in this film is famous.

Plot
The movie begins with Sumathi (Vandana Gupta) and Subramaniam (Arun Vijay), strangers to one another, meeting at a suicide point in Chennai. They realize that their goal is the same: suicide. Both had chosen to end their lives and duly write suicide notes. Sumathy's reason for taking the extreme step is her nagging relatives, who are also her guardians. They are after her ancestral money. Subramaniam is cheated by a friend who promises a job for him in Dubai after taking Rs. 5 lakh from him. Both consume sleeping pills in a bid to end their lives in Subramaniam's room.

Parallel narration is the comedy track of petty thief Keeripulla (Vadivelu).
 
However, Subramaniam and Sumathi are rescued by the house owner Mani (Janakaraj). Life takes a turn, and Subramaniam lands a good job, while Sumathy's relatives take her home. Subramaniam's marriage is settled with a girl of his mother's choice, and Sumathy's marriage is fixed with her maternal uncle. Both flee the respective marriage halls independently. How they reunite forms the crux.

Cast

Soundtrack
The soundtrack was composed by D. Imman.

Critical reception
Indiaglitz called it "breezy love story for youngsters." Behindwoods wrote "As the sequences right from the start to the finish tread on an expected path, it is difficult to get involved with the film. There is no depth in story, screenplay and narration is weak and pathetic." Rediff wrote "Debutant Sakthi Paramesh directs the proceedings as if he doesn't give a damn. Lesser pleasure the audiences take home, the merrier. Nearly every known film device -- plot, logic and good dialogue -- is thrown to the winds as actors and technicians recklessly go through the mere motions of making a movie."

Legacy

In early 2015, a quote and shot from the film has been used as a meme template, called Aahaan. This word was spoken by Vadivelu in one comedy scene involving him and Arun Vijay at a bus stop. The exact reason for this sudden phenomenon is unspecified, but it is believed that due to the unspecific tone that he says this line in, and given the fact that he has said this line frequently throughout his career with different tones, it has become a fan-favorite quote.

References

2007 films
Tamil remakes of Telugu films
2000s Tamil-language films
Films scored by D. Imman